The Pullman Bride is a 1917 American silent comedy film directed by Clarence G. Badger and starring Gloria Swanson.

Cast
 Gloria Swanson as The Girl
 Mack Swain as The Chosen One
 Chester Conklin as A Rejected Suitor
 Laura La Varnie as The Girl's Mother
 Tom Kennedy as A Bandit
 Polly Moran as Sheriff Nell
 Wayland Trask, Jr.
 Gene Rogers
 Jack Cooper 
 Vera Steadman
 Abdul
 Glen Cavender
 James Donnelly as Bit Role (uncredited)
 Elinor Field as Sennett Bathing Girl (uncredited)
 Albert T. Gillespie as Bit Role (uncredited)
 Phyllis Haver as Sennett Bathing Girl (uncredited)
 Anthony O'Sullivan as Bit Role (uncredited)
 Marvel Rea as Sennett Bathing Girl (uncredited)

References

External links

1917 films
American silent short films
American black-and-white films
1917 comedy films
1917 short films
Films directed by Clarence G. Badger
Keystone Studios films
Films produced by Mack Sennett
Silent American comedy films
American comedy short films
1910s American films